Nikolay Nikolayevich Buchholtz (22 July 1881, Ryazan — 14 December 1943, Moscow) was a Soviet and Russian scientist and a specialist in the field of analytical mechanics. Major-General of the Engineering and Aviation Service, Professor, Doctor of Physical and Mathematical Sciences. Laureate of Stalin Prize.

Biography 
Nikolay Nikolayevich Buchholtz was born on 22 July 1881 in Ryazan. In 1914 he graduated from the Physics and Mathematics Faculty of Moscow University.

Head of the Department of Theoretical Mechanics of Moscow Power Engineering Institute in 1930—1933. Professor (1931). In 1933—1938 — Head of the Department of Elasticity Theory of Moscow State University.

In 1938-1943 he was acting head of the Department of Theoretical Mechanics of Moscow State University (while the previous head of this department, Professor Aleksandr Nekrasov was imprisoned together with Andrei Tupolev). He also worked at Zhukovsky Air Force Engineering Academy.

Now he in the first place is remembered as the author of Basic course of theoretical mechanics textbook, which was first published in 1932 and for many years had been the primary book on the topic of theoretical mechanics for Soviet students.

He lived in Moscow, in Plotnikov Lane, 20. He was a parishioner and altarpiece of St. Nicholas Church of the Carpenters in Moscow.

Nikolay Buchholtz died on 13 December 1943 and was buried at Novodevichy Cemetery in Moscow.

References 

1881 births
1943 deaths
Moscow State University alumni
Academic staff of Moscow State University
Academic staff of Moscow Power Engineering Institute
Stalin Prize winners
Recipients of the Order of Lenin
Recipients of the Order of the Red Banner of Labour
Engineers from the Russian Empire
Soviet major generals
Soviet mechanical engineers
Burials at Novodevichy Cemetery